Domenico Maria Leone Cirillo FRS (Grumo Nevano, Kingdom of Naples 10 April 1739Naples 29 October 1799) was an Italian physician, entomologist, botanist and patriot.

Professional life
Appointed while still young to a botanical professorship, Cirillo went for some years to England, where he was elected Fellow of the Royal Society, and to France. On his return to Naples he was appointed to the chair of medical practice and afterwards to the chair of theoretical medicine. He wrote copiously on scientific subjects and had practiced medicine extensively. He was the teacher of the future military doctor Antonio Savaresi.

Cirillo's favorite study was botany. He was known as an entomologist by Linnaeus. He wrote many books in Latin and Italian, all of them treatises on medical and scientific subjects. The  is a philosophical pamphlet remarkable for both its learning and style. He introduced many medical innovations to Naples, particularly inoculation against smallpox. As well as several works on hygiene he also wrote:
 , Naples, 1771
 
 
 , Naples, 1787 – 1792

Patriot and refugee
With French help the Parthenopean Republic was established in January 1799, causing the monarch and his government to flee to Sicily. After at first refusing to take part in the new government, Cirillo consented to be chosen as a representative of the people and became a member of the legislative commission, of which he was eventually elected president. By June of the same year, the republic collapsed when the French withdrew and the city was overtaken by Cardinal Ruffo's counter-revolutionary Sanfedista army. Ferdinand IV's army returned to Naples, and the republicans withdrew to the forts, ill-armed and with inadequate provisions. After a short siege the Republicans surrendered on what they considered honorable terms: life and liberty being guaranteed them by the signatures of Ruffo, of Foote, and of Micheroux.

The arrival of Lord Nelson changed the state of affairs, and he refused to ratify the capitulation. Secure under the British flag, Ferdinand and his wife, Marie Caroline of Austria, showed themselves eager for revenge, and Cirillo joined other republicans in fighting back.

Cirillo wrote to Emma, Lady Hamilton (wife of the British ambassador to Naples) asking her to intercede on his behalf, but Nelson wrote of the petition: "Domenico Cirillo, who had been the King's physician, might have been saved, but that he chose to play the fool and lie, denying that he had ever made any speeches against the government, and saying that he only took care of the poor in the hospitals". He was condemned to death, and hanged on 29 October 1799.

Today Grumo Nevano, his hometown, has name a school after him (now the Institute Comprehensive Matteotti-Cirillo), erected a statue in the central square of the town, and named a library "Biblioteca Comunale Domenico Cirillo". The state boarding school in Bari and the High School of Aversa in Caserta are also named for him.

Works

References

1739 births
1799 deaths
People from the Province of Naples
People executed by hanging
Italian entomologists
Executed Italian people
People executed by the Kingdom of Naples
18th-century executions
18th-century Italian botanists
People of the Parthenopean Republic